Claus Hallingdal Bloch (born 12 March 1977) is a Danish orienteering competitor. He received a bronze medal in the sprint event at the 2006 World Orienteering Championships in Aarhus, behind Emil Wingstedt and Daniel Hubmann. He participated on the Danish team that finished 8th at the 2006 World championship.

See also
 Danish orienteers
 List of orienteers
 List of orienteering events

References

External links
 
 

1977 births
Living people
Danish orienteers
Male orienteers
Foot orienteers
World Orienteering Championships medalists
Competitors at the 2005 World Games